Listen to Love is a 2016 South Korean television series starring Lee Sun-kyun and Song Ji-hyo about husbands who try to protect their marriage with the help of anonymous netizens, based on the 2007 Japanese TV series of the same title. It aired on JTBC's Fridays and Saturdays at 20:30 (KST) time slot from October 28 to December 3, 2016 for 12 episodes.

Synopsis
Do Hyun-woo (Lee Sun-kyun), a ten-year veteran producer, believes that his wife Jung Soo-yeon (Song Ji-hyo) is having an affair. They have been married for eight years in what he believed was a strong relationship, until he catches on to a sign that his wife is on the verge of cheating. This pushes him to talk with anonymous people on online social networks to figure out what to do and try to save his marriage.

Cast

Main
 Lee Sun-kyun as Do Hyun-woo / Toycrane (username)
 Song Ji-hyo as Jung Soo-yeon
 Kim Hee-won as Choi Yoon-gi
 Ye Ji-won as Eun Ah-ra
 Lee Sang-yeob as An Joon-young
 BoA as Kwon Bo-young

Supporting
 Lee Do-yeon as Yoon-gi's secretary
 Ye Soo-jung as Hyun-woo's mother
 Kim Kang-hoon as Do Joon-soo
 Lee Seok-jun as Ji Seon-woo
 Han Seo-jin as Yoon-gi's secret mistress
 Park Soo-young as Park Young-soo
 Jung A-in as Jung Eun-jung
 Jung Ji-ahn as Kim Mi-ha
 Shim Hee-sub as Lee Ji-hoon
 Lee Su-woong as Kang Seung-hyun
 Kim Young-ok
 Lee Do-yeop as Hyun Chan
 Kim Hye-ok as Myunmokdongok (username) 
 Woo Hyun as Hanganggabshida (username) 
 Jo Jae-ryong as Bbinkkobeunseunim (username) 
 Kim Sun-hwa as Doksoogongbangnyeo (username) 
 Jang Liu as Wetoli (username) 
 Lee Byung-jin as Nooneneunnoon (username) 
 Kim Tae-woo as Hyoomungeubshigchoong (username)

Other
 Baek Bo-ram

Special appearances
 Eun Ji-won
 Kang Ho-dong
 Jung Yu-mi
 Lee Hwi-jae
 Ki Tae-young

Ratings

References

External links
  
 
 

2016 South Korean television series debuts
2016 South Korean television series endings
Adultery in television
JTBC television dramas
Korean-language television shows
South Korean television series based on Japanese television series
South Korean romance television series
Television series by Drama House